The year 546 BC was a year of the pre-Julian Roman calendar. In the Roman Empire, it was known as year 208 Ab urbe condita. The denomination 546 BC for this year has been used since the early medieval period, when the Anno Domini calendar era became the prevalent method in Europe for naming years.

Events
 Lydia is conquered by Persia.
 Cyrus makes Pasargadae the capital of Persia.
 Peisistratus takes power in Athens.
 Eupalinos of Megara, a Greek architect, builds aqueducts that supply water to Athens.
 Cyrus establishes a garrison in Sardis and incorporates the Greek cities of Ionia in Asia Minor into the Achaemenid Empire.
 A coup takes place in the state of Qi.
 Jin and Chu agreed to the truce of Mibing, ending their constant military engagement.

Births

Deaths
 Thales, Greek philosopher (approximate date)

References